The Brandt 60 mm Long Range gun-mortar is a breech loading mortar capable of firing on a flat trajectory. It was developed from the Brandt Mle CM60A1 and resembles a long-barrelled, long-ranged variant of that weapon.

Description
The Brandt 60mm LR gun-mortar was developed directly from the Brandt Mle CM60A1 and retains the same falling block breech mechanism reminiscent of direct fire artillery. The firing pin is automatically withdrawn when the breech is unlocked, reducing the potential for misfire. Like its predecessor, it can be either muzzle-loaded or breech-loaded and was designed to be mounted in the turrets of armored fighting vehicles. The LR gun-mortar was also tested as a deck-mounted support weapon for maritime patrol craft such as the VCSM. It utilizes a hydraulic recoil system. The recoil length is 170mm, maximum recoil thrust is 2,800kg, and the weight of the recoiling mass is 75kg.

The LR gun-mortar has a total length of 1.8 metres. Different variants were produced with electrical or mechanical firing mechanisms.

Ammunition
The LR gun-mortar was designed to fire specialized long range ammunition with an indirect fire range of 5,000 metres and a direct fire range of 500 metres. The standard LR high-explosive projectile possessed a fuze which detonated at any angle of impact. It was manufactured of perlitic cast iron and had unfolding fins. The projectile weighed 2.2kg and had a total length of 367mm. Brandt claimed that its explosive charge possessed an efficiency comparable to that of an 81mm mortar bomb.

The LR gun-mortar could also fire any of the standard 60mm ammunition produced for French infantry mortars, including the Mk 72, Mk 61, and Mk 35/47 high-explosive projectiles, as well as the Mk 63 illumination shell. However, without the specialized ammunition indirect fire range is reduced to 3,000 metres and direct fire range to 400 metres.

See also
Brandt 60 mm HB Gun-Mortar
MCB-81 81 mm gun-mortar
2B9 Vasilek 82 mm gun-mortar
List of artillery
List of infantry mortars

References

 Hogg, Ian (2000). Twentieth-Century Artillery. Friedman/Fairfax Publishers.  Pg.166

60 mm artillery
60mm mortars
Vehicle weapons
Cold War artillery of France
Mortars of France
Gun-mortars